Rajna is a surname. In several Eastern European languages such as Hungarian, Rajna is the name of the river Rhine.

Notable people with this surname include:
 András Rajna (born 1960), Hungarian sprint canoer
 Daniel Rajna (born 1968), South African ballet dancer
 Mihály Rácz Rajna (born 1934), Hungarian stage actor
 Miklós Rajna (born 1991), Hungarian ice hockey goaltender
 Rajna Dragićević, Serbian linguist, lexicologist and lexicographer
 Thomas Rajna (1928–2021), British composer